Ispra is a comune and small town on the eastern coast of Lake Maggiore, in the province of Varese (Lombardy, northern Italy).

Toponymy

Attested by the name Ispira (712), Ispira (XIV). Appears as Ispratium in Aegidius Tschudi's Beschreibung Galliae Comatae. According to Gaudenzio Merula the origin of the name could lie onto the rocky nature of this landscape; Hisprum quasi asperum ob saxorum difficultates, that is to say equivalent to the Latin hispida (cf. hispid and ispido) and related to the Provençal ispre with the "d" shifting to an "r" due to rhotacism.

Joint Research Centre
Some of the main Institutes of the Joint Research Centre (JRC) of the European Commission (EC) are located there, including the Institute for the Protection and the Security of the Citizen (IPSC), the Institute for Environment and Sustainability (IES) and the Institute for Health and Consumer Protection (IHCP), as well as the Ispra site Directorate (IS).

Locally, the research establishment is referred to as the CCR (Centro Comune di Ricerca) or as EURATOM - based on its history in nuclear research.

The site still contains a number of experimental nuclear reactors in the process of being decommissioned.

Famous descendants
The Italian American ballerina Enrica Soma (the mother of actress Anjelica Huston) was born to parents who had immigrated to the U.S. from Ispra.

See also
Joint Research Centre

References